The 1947 North Dakota Fighting Sioux football team was an American football team that represented University of North Dakota in North Central Conference (NCC) during the 1947 college football season. In its third season under head coach Red Jarrett, the team compiled a 4–4 record (2–2 against NCC opponents), finished in fourth place in the NCC, and was outscored  by a total of 128 to 126. The team played its home games at Memorial Stadium in Grand Forks, North Dakota.

Schedule

References

North Dakota
North Dakota Fighting Hawks football seasons
North Dakota Football